Beverly Fort was a fort that existed from 1775 to 1776 during the American Revolutionary War on Hospital Point in Beverly, Massachusetts. It was reoccupied in 1814 during the War of 1812. In 1801, a smallpox hospital was built and used in 1814 as a barracks. The J-shaped earthwork of the fort still exists today.

See also
List of military installations in Massachusetts

References

Beverly
Buildings and structures in Beverly, Massachusetts
Beverly
Beverly